Metropolitan Edison Co. v. People Against Nuclear Energy, 460 U.S. 766 (1983), was a case decided by the United States Supreme Court.

Background 
After the meltdown of reactor number 2 at Three Mile Island, the People Against Nuclear Energy (PANE) contended that restarting reactor number 1 would cause severe psychological trauma to residents of nearby towns. When the NRC failed to consider this evidence in the statutorily required environmental impact statement, PANE sought review in the court of appeals, citing National Environmental Policy Act (NEPA) protections of the natural environment. The court granted the petition for review, and agreed with PANE that the NRC had acted improperly in failing to consider their evidence.

Holding
The Court ruled that the Nuclear Regulatory Commission did not act improperly in not considering the conditions of PANE.

In considering such concerns as warm water released into the Susquehanna River, and the release of low level radiation, the NRC acted properly under § 102(C) of the NEPA in considering environmental risks.

Concurrence
Justice Brennan filed a concurring opinion, agreeing with the Court's reasoning, but noting that PANE's argument extended the chain of causation too far by attempting to link restarting the reactor with the hypothetical psychological injury of a "perception of risk."

See also
 Jackson v. Metropolitan Edison Co. (1974)
 List of United States Supreme Court cases, volume 460

References

United States Supreme Court cases
United States environmental case law
1983 in the environment
1983 in United States case law
Nuclear power in the United States
Nuclear safety in the United States
United States energy case law
Three Mile Island accident
FirstEnergy
United States Supreme Court cases of the Burger Court